Kerem Reim is an Israeli outpost in the West Bank, located in the Mateh Binyamin area. The international community considers Israeli settlements in the West Bank illegal under international law, whereas Israeli outposts, like Kerem Reim, are considered illegal both under international law as well as under Israeli law.

The settlement's name (Reim, Hebrew for "friends") is named after three Israeli soldiers who were killed during military operations.

History 
Kerem Reim was established in 2009 as an unauthorized Israeli outpost under the name of Nahali Tal. Nahali Tal acquired a mikveh in 2014. In late 2016 vandals broke into the outpost and damaged the local irrigation system. The vandals also attacked a vineyard owned by the Jewish Agency, displacing 500 seedlings. Authorities accused Palestinians and left-wing activists of responsibility.

After repeated complaints by the Peace Now movement, the High Court of Justice issued an injunction to prevent the then-ongoing construction of 20 buildings in the community for a temporary amount of time. Kerem Reim was authorized as an official settlement in 2017. In December 2021 the Ministry of Religious Services said it would help allocate money to establish a synagogue in the town.

Notes

References

External links 

 
 

2017 establishments in Israel
Mateh Binyamin Regional Council
Israeli settlements in the West Bank
2009 establishments in Israel
Israeli outposts
Unauthorized Israeli settlements